Heracleium or Herakleion was a city on the south coast of ancient Pieria, Macedon, between Phila and Leibethra. During Peloponnesian war it passed into Athenian control in the years 430/29, 425/4 and 421 BCE. After Athenian alliance with Perdiccas II in 413 BCE it became again a city of Macedon.

The site of Heracleium is near the modern Platamon.

References

The Athenian Tribute Lists  by Benjamin D. Meritt
An Inventory of Archaic and Classical Poleis  By Mogens Herman Hansen, Thomas Heine Nielsen
Two Studies in Ancient Macedonian Topography - Page 46 by Miltiadēs V. Chatzopoulos, Louiza D. Loukopoulou
 CNN Transcript: Archaeologists Discover Ancient Cities Under Mediterranean

Geography of ancient Pieria
Cities in ancient Macedonia
Populated places in ancient Macedonia
Former populated places in Greece
Members of the Delian League